Roger Bowling (born May 8, 1982) is an American professional mixed martial artist currently competing in the Welterweight division. A professional competitor since 2007, Bowling competed for the UFC and Strikeforce.

Background
Bowling was born and raised in the small village of Neville, Ohio, and is the oldest of three siblings. Bowling's early life was difficult as his father was a drug addict who was often in and out of jail while Bowling's mother had to work two jobs, which including driving a school bus, to support the family. Bowling was athletic playing sports such as football and baseball, but his athletic activities were limited by a lack of transportation. He attended Felicity Franklin Highschool. He was frequently suspended or expelled from highschool for picking fights and had been looking forward to leave the town. When he was 18 years old he went to live with his girlfriend and go to Grant vocational school to learn welding. Bowling has a background in amateur boxing with an undefeated 9-0 record, having competed and dominated his opponents in Toughman-like competitions. Bowling later joined a gym where he was introduced him to mixed martial arts.

Mixed martial arts career

Early career
After joining the MMA gym, Bowling had his first fight against an opponent who, at 6'6, towered over the 5'9 Bowling. Despite the huge size disadvantage, Bowling won the bout and broke his opponent's nose. Bowling competed as a Middleweight for all of his amateur fights, and held an amateur record of 3-1.

From 2007 to 2009, Bowling built his career fighting for the MMA Big Show, a regional promotion known for pitting up and comers against UFC veterans to springboard talent. He earned the Welterweight Championship and carried the belt until MMA Big Show promoter and manager Jason Appleton signed Bowling to a three-year deal with Strikeforce.

On June 20, 2009 Bowling was set to fight the controversial former UFC Welterweight War Machine, formerly known as Jon Koppenhaver. However Bowling broke his hand a couple of weeks before the event and was not cleared to fight. The two agreed to fight later in the year. Before the rescheduled match up, Roger defeated Devon Plaisance via TKO in July 2009. Bowling was again set to fight War Machine in the main event of XFC 9 in Tampa, Florida on September 5, however, Bowling was again forced to withdraw due to injury.

Strikeforce
In October 2009, Bowling signed with Strikeforce. He was set to make his debut in November 2009, but was forced to withdraw because of an injury.

Bowling subsequently made his debut in May 2010 on the Strikeforce Challengers: Lindland vs. Casey card against Bobby Voelker. Bowling dominated the first two rounds, but was unable to stop Voelker. The fight ended controversially as it was stopped in the third round due to an unintentional eye injury. Per the rules, the fight went to the judges' scorecards and Bowling was awarded a unanimous decision win.

Bowling and Voelker had a rematch in the main event of the Strikeforce Challengers: Bowling vs. Voelker card on October 22, 2010. After controlling the action in the first round, demonstrating his speed and striking advantage, Bowling lost the fight in the second round via TKO (strikes), after being hurt by Voelker's ground and pound technique, and was given his first professional loss. Bowling and Voelker fought for a third time at Strikeforce Challengers: Voelker vs. Bowling III to create Strikeforce's first trilogy. Once again, Voelker won the fight via TKO in the second round.

Bowling next faced Jerron Peoples at Strikeforce: Melendez vs. Masvidal on December 17, 2011. Despite Peoples weighing in nearly 10 pounds heavy, Bowling won the fight via knockout at just under a minute in the first round.

On March 3, 2012, Bowling faced Brandon Saling at Strikeforce: Tate vs. Rousey in Columbus, Ohio and won via TKO in the second round.

Ultimate Fighting Championship
In January 2013, the Strikeforce organization was closed by its parent company Zuffa. A list of fighters scheduled to be brought over to the Ultimate Fighting Championship was released in mid-January and Bowling was one of the fighters listed.

Bowling made his UFC and Lightweight debut against Anthony Njokuani on April 20, 2013 at UFC on Fox 7. He lost via second-round knockout.

Bowling faced Abel Trujillo on August 28, 2013 at UFC Fight Night 27. The fight ended in controversial fashion as Trujillo landed what appeared to be an illegal knee to the face of Bowling at the end of round two. With Bowling unable to continue, the referee deemed the bout a no contest. In a post-fight interview with Ariel Helwani, Bowling was upset as he felt he had been winning the fight until the illegal knee, and wanted a rematch with Trujillo.

A rematch with Trujillo took place on December 14, 2013 at UFC on Fox 9. Bowling lost via TKO in the second round, and was released from the promotion shortly after the fight.

Personal life
Bowling is married and has a daughter. Aside from professional fighting, he works for an engineering company that builds custom machinery.

Championships and accomplishments

Mixed martial arts
American Fight League
American Fight League Amateur Middleweight Championship (One time)
Caged Inferno
Caged Inferno Amateur Middleweight Championship (One time)
MMA Big Show
MMA Big Show Welterweight Championship (One time)
Revolution Fight League
Revolution Fight League Welterweight Championship (One time)

Mixed martial arts record

|-
|Loss
|align=center|12–6 (1)
|Nicolae Cury
|Submission (armbar) 
|Z Promotions: Fight Night Medicine Hat 2
|
|align=center|1
|align=center|3:38
|Medicine Hat, Alberta, Canada
|
|-
|  Win
| align=center| 12–5 (1)
| Joshua Thorpe
| KO (punches)
| Absolute Action 43
| 
| align=center| 1
| align=center| 1:37
| Highland Heights, Kentucky, United States
| 
|-
|  Loss
| align=center| 11–5 (1)
| Abel Trujillo
| TKO (punches)
| UFC on Fox: Johnson vs. Benavidez 2
| 
| align=center| 2
| align=center| 1:35
| Sacramento, California, United States
| 
|-
|  NC
| align=center| 11–4 (1)
| Abel Trujillo
| NC (illegal knee) 
| UFC Fight Night: Condit vs. Kampmann 2
| 
| align=center| 2
| align=center| 4:57
| Indianapolis, Indiana, United States
| 
|-
|  Loss
| align=center| 11–4
| Anthony Njokuani
| KO (punch)
| UFC on Fox: Henderson vs. Melendez
| 
| align=center| 2
| align=center| 2:52
| San Jose, California, United States
| 
|-
|  Loss
| align=center| 11–3
| Tarec Saffiedine
| Decision (unanimous)
| Strikeforce: Rousey vs. Kaufman
| 
| align=center| 3
| align=center| 5:00
| San Diego, California, United States
| 
|-
|  Win
| align=center| 11–2
| Brandon Saling
| TKO (punches)
| Strikeforce: Tate vs. Rousey
| 
| align=center| 2
| align=center| 1:15
| Columbus, Ohio, United States
| 
|-
|  Win
| align=center| 10–2
| Jerron Peoples
| KO (punches)
| Strikeforce: Melendez vs. Masvidal
| 
| align=center| 1
| align=center| 0:42
| San Diego, California, United States
| 
|-
|  Loss
| align=center| 9–2
| Bobby Voelker
| TKO (knee and punches)
| Strikeforce Challengers: Voelker vs. Bowling III
| 
| align=center| 2
| align=center| 2:16
| Las Vegas, Nevada, United States
| 
|-
|  Win
| align=center| 9–1
| Josh Thornburg
| Decision (unanimous)
| Strikeforce: Feijao vs. Henderson
| 
| align=center| 3
| align=center| 5:00
| Columbus, Ohio, United States
| 
|-
|  Loss
| align=center| 8–1
| Bobby Voelker
| TKO (punches)
| Strikeforce Challengers: Bowling vs. Voelker
| 
| align=center| 2
| align=center| 3:58
| Fresno, California, United States
| 
|-
| Win
| align=center| 8–0
| Bobby Voelker
| Technical Decision (unanimous)
| Strikeforce Challengers: Lindland vs. Casey
| 
| align=center| 3
| align=center| 1:38
| Portland, Oregon, United States
| 
|-
| Win
| align=center| 7–0
| Jerrod Appenzeller
| TKO (punches)
| MMA Big Show: Triple Threat
| 
| align=center| 2
| align=center| 0:14
| Vevay, Indiana, United States
| 
|-
| Win
| align=center| 6–0
| Devon Plaisance
| TKO (punches)
| MMA Big Show: Unstoppable
| 
| align=center| 1
| align=center| 0:41
| Vevay, Indiana, United States
| 
|-
| Win
| align=center| 5–0
| Seth Baczynski
| KO (punches)
| MMA Big Show: Retribution
| 
| align=center| 1
| align=center| 0:09
| Vevay, Indiana, United States
| 
|-
| Win
| align=center| 4–0
| Paul Mann
| Submission (guillotine choke)
| MMA Big Show: Relentless
| 
| align=center| 1
| align=center| 3:20
| Covington, Kentucky, United States
| 
|-
| Win
| align=center| 3–0
| Shamar Bailey
| TKO (punches)
| RFL: Hostile Takeover
| 
| align=center| 1
| align=center| 0:28
| Louisville, Kentucky, United States
| 
|-
| Win
| align=center| 2–0
| Michael Skiba
| TKO (submission to punches)
| MMA Big Show: Punishment
| 
| align=center| 1
| align=center| 1:25
| Covington, Kentucky, United States
| 
|-
| Win
| align=center| 1–0
| Chris Runge
| TKO (punches)
| MMA Big Show: Domination
| 
| align=center| 1
| align=center| 1:56
| Cincinnati, Ohio, United States
|

References

External links
 Official website
 
 

1982 births
Living people
American male mixed martial artists
Mixed martial artists from Ohio
Lightweight mixed martial artists
Welterweight mixed martial artists
Mixed martial artists utilizing boxing
Ultimate Fighting Championship male fighters
American male boxers
Boxers from Ohio
People from Clermont County, Ohio